10bet is an online gambling company founded in 2003. It offers sports betting, casino and live casino. 10bet has over 1 million registered customers and it is licensed by the Gambling Commission.

Overview 
Founded in 2003, 10bet is regulated by Malta Gaming Authority and operated by Ocean Star Limited. The Great Britain business is licensed by Gambling Commission. The Swedish business is licensed by the Swedish Gambling Authority. The company also holds a Remote Bookmaker's Licence in Ireland.

Awards
In 2019, 10bet won Fresh Awards for design and branding. The same year, 10bet was shortlisted for a Graphis design award.

See also
 Gambling in the United Kingdom

References 

Internet properties established in 2003
Online gambling companies